Fabrizio Anselmi (born 11 May 1978) is an Italian footballer who plays as a defender. He spent most of his career in Italian Lega Pro.

Career
Born in Rome, Lazio, Anselmi is a youth product of Lodigiani. In 2002, he left for Sassari Torres and then Grosseto. He settled in Sassuolo, which he followed the team promoted twice from Serie C2 to Serie B in 2008. Anselmi was the defender in 2006 and 2007 promotion playoffs (only missed once in 2006 and replaced by Girelli), but did not play in 2008 Supercoppa di Lega di Prima Divisione. After promoted to Serie B, he was one of the team's starting centre-backs along with Marco Andreolli.

In 2009, he left for Verona on a 2-year contract. On 31 August 2010 he left for Barletta in 2-year contract.

On 31 January 2011 he was traded to Pisa for Federico Cerone.

In August 2011 he was released by Barletta.

Honours
Sassuolo
 Supercoppa di Lega di Prima Divisione: 2008
 Lega Pro Prima Divisione: 2008

References

Italian footballers
Serie B players
A.S. Lodigiani players
F.C. Grosseto S.S.D. players
U.S. Sassuolo Calcio players
Hellas Verona F.C. players
A.S.D. Barletta 1922 players
Association football defenders
Footballers from Rome
1978 births
Living people